Frank Wagenstroom (born 16 June 1985 in Cape Town) is a South African rugby union player who has previously represented The Sharks, Valke, Western Province and Free State Cheetahs at first-class level. Wagenstroom plays on the right wing as well as at inside centre, outside centre and fullback.

External links
 Sharks profile

1985 births
South African rugby union players
Sharks (Currie Cup) players
Rugby union wings
Free State Cheetahs players
Living people
Rugby union players from Cape Town